In coin collecting, a key date refers to a date (or date and mint mark combination) of a given coin series or set that is harder to obtain than other dates in the series. The next level of difficult to obtain coins in  series are often referred to as semi-key dates or simply semi-keys.

External links 
 Key Date Coin Guides
More Key Date Coin Guides

References 

Numismatics